The 1978–79 NBA season was the Bucks' 11th season in the NBA.

Draft picks

Roster

Regular season

Season standings

z - clinched division title
y - clinched division title
x - clinched playoff spot

Record vs. opponents

Game log

|-style="background:#fcc;"
| 1 || October 14, 1978 || @ San Antonio
| L 111–153
|
|
|
| HemisFair Arena
| 0—1
|-style="background:#bbffbb;"
| 2 || October 15, 1978 || @ New Orleans
| W 123–112
|
|
|
| Louisiana Superdome
| 1—1

Player statistics

Transactions

Trades

Free Agents

Awards and records
Marques Johnson, All-NBA First Team

References

Milwaukee Bucks seasons
Milwaukee
Milwau
Milwau